Marius Toma (born May 15, 1986 in Mihăileşti, Buzău) is a Romanian football goalkeeper. He received the "Meritul Sportiv" Medal in 2006 from president Traian Băsescu.

Club career

He played for Steaua II București, Concordia Chiajna, Farul, Rm. Vâlcea.

References

External links
 

1986 births
Living people
Romanian footballers
Association football goalkeepers
People from Buzău County